S. A. Sathya is an Indian politician and is Member of the Legislative Assembly of Tamil Nadu. He was elected to the Tamil Nadu legislative assembly as a Dravida Munnetra Kazhagam candidate from Hosur constituency in the by-election in 2019.

References 

Living people
Dravida Munnetra Kazhagam politicians
Members of the Tamil Nadu Legislative Assembly
Year of birth missing (living people)